Paolo Gismondi (known also as Paolo Perugino) (1612 in Perugia – 1685) was an Italian painter of the Baroque period.

He was a pupil of Giovanni Antonio Scaramuccia in Perugia, then of Pietro da Cortona in Rome. Under commission by Cardinal Barberini, he frescoed the church of Santa Agata ai Monti in Rome. He also painted for the sacristy of Sant'Agnese in Agone. He was admitted to the Academy of St Luke in 1668. Late in life he traveled to Perugia and then Naples, but died in Rome.

References

1612 births
1685 deaths
17th-century Italian painters
Italian male painters
Italian Baroque painters